Cameron Norrie defeated the defending champion Carlos Alcaraz in the final, 5–7, 6–4, 7–5 to win the singles tennis title at the 2023 Rio Open. It was their second final meeting in as many weeks, with Alcaraz winning the title in Buenos Aires the week prior.

This tournament marked the retirement of former top 25 player Thomaz Bellucci. He lost in the first round to Sebastián Báez.

Seeds

Draw

Finals

Top half

Bottom half

Qualifying

Seeds

Qualifiers

Lucky loser

Qualifying draw

First qualifier

Second qualifier

Third qualifier

Fourth qualifier

References

External links
 Main draw
 Qualifying draw

Rio Open - Singles
Rio Open